John Plumbe Jr. (occasionally Plumb; July 13, 1809 – May 29, 1857) was a Welsh-born American entrepreneurial photographer, gallerist, publisher, and an early advocate of an American transcontinental railroad in the mid-19th century. He established a franchise of photography studios in the 1840s in the U.S., with additional branches in Paris and Liverpool. He created a lithographic process for reproducing photographic images, called the "plumbeotype."

Biography

Plumbe was born in Castle Caereinion, Powys, Wales in 1809, to John Plumbe and Frances Margaretta Atherton. The family moved to Philipsburg, Pennsylvania in 1821, and later to Dubuque, Iowa.

Vision for a transcontinental railroad 

He began his career as a civil engineer. "He studied civil engineering while still in his late teens and by 1829 was surveying sites for future railroad routes in the southern and eastern portions of the country. About 1836 he relocated to the Wisconsin territory, where he became and advocate for a trans-contintental railroad." Plumbe reasoned that a transcontintental railroad "would hasten the formation of dense settlements throughout the whole extent of the road, advance the sales of the public lands, afford increased facilities to the agricultural, commercial and mining interests of the country...and enable the government to transport troops and munitions of war."

Throughout his life Plumbe would continue to press for the railroad, petitioning Congress and presenting his ideas in various newspapers and other publications.

Daguerreotype galleries, 1840-1847 

Plumbe "took up photography in 1840 after seeing the work of an itinerant daguerreotypist in Washington, D.C."—probably the work of John G. Stevenson.

In a short period of time, Plumbe established a string of daguerreotype studios and galleries, all bearing his name. Visitors to the galleries could view photographic works, receive training, or pay to have their portrait taken. Images produced in the Plumbe studios were credited to "Plumbe," although the work was made by others, including his brother Richard Plumbe. "Each of his galleries was staffed by a host of operators, colorists, and artisans, and many notable daguerreotypists received their training or honed their skills in Plumbe's galleries, including Richard Carr, Marsena Cannon, Charles E. Johnson, Jacob Shew, Myron Shew, and William Shew." Others who learnt photographic arts through the Plumbe franchise included Ezra Chase, Samuel Masury, C.S. Middlebrook, and Gabriel Harrison.

In the 1840s in the United States there were Plumbe franchises in:
 Arkansas—Plumbe's Daguerrian Gallery
 Galena, Illinois
 Dubuque, Iowa
 Kentucky:
 Harrodsburg Springs, Kentucky
 Louisville, Kentucky
 New Orleans, Louisiana
 Portland, Maine
 Maryland:
 Baltimore, Maryland—Plumbe Daguerrian Gallery, North St.; Plumbe National Daguerrian Gallery, Baltimore St.
 Frederick, Maryland
 Massachusetts:
 Boston, Mass. -- United States Photographic Institute (1841); Plumbe Daguerrian Gallery, Court St.; Plumbe National Daguerrian Gallery, Hanover St.; Plumbe's Daguerrean Rooms, Court Street (1849–1850); Plumbe's Daguerrian Gallery, Washington Street (1850–1851).
 Salem, Massachusetts
 St. Louis, Missouri
 Exeter, New Hampshire
 New York:
 Albany, New York—Plumbe Daguerrian Gallery
 New York, New York—Plumbe Daguerrian Gallery, Broadway; Plumbe National Daguerrian Gallery, Broadway
 Saratoga Springs, New York—Plumbe National Daguerrian Gallery, Broadway
 Cincinnati, Ohio
 Pennsylvania:
 Harrisburg, Pennsylvania
 Philadelphia, PA—Plumbe Daguerrian Gallery, Chestnut St.;  Plumbe National Daguerrian Gallery, Chestnut St.
 Newport, Rhode Island—Plumbe Daguerrian Gallery, Thames St.
 Virginia:
 Alexandria, Virginia
 Petersburg, Virginia
 Washington, DC—Plumbe National Daguerrian Gallery, Pennsylvania Ave., Main St., Walnut St.

Abroad, he opened branches in:
 Liverpool, England—Plumbe National Daguerrian Gallery, Church St.
 St. Catharines, Ontario, Canada
 Paris, France—Plumbe National Daguerrian Gallery, Vieille Rue du Temple

By 1847-1848 Plumbe sold his part of the galleries he'd established. "He sold his New York gallery to William H. Butler, his head man there, in 1847, and the other galleries soon changed ownership, though the name "Plumbe's Daguerrean Gallery" was retained as late as 1852 in Boston (John P. Nichols, proprietor), and 1850 in Washington (Blanchard P. Paige, proprietor)."

Exhibitions 

Plumbe entered his photographic work in several exhibitions, including:
 Massachusetts Charitable Mechanic Association, Quincy Hall, Boston, 1844. Plumbe exhibited "35 daguerreotypes, in frames. Peculiarly pleasing, and natural in expression. Silver medal."
 Fair of the American Institute, NY (1845)

Publishing 

In 1846 he founded the National Publishing Company which produced the weekly Popular Magazine (Augustine J.H. Duganne, editor) and other works.

California and Iowa, 1849-1857 

Plumbe lived in California from 1849 to 1854. In 1854 returned to Dubuque, Iowa. He may have worked for photographer Mathew Brady, c. 1855-1857. He died in Iowa in 1857, at age 48.

Legacy
Examples of Plumbe's work are in the New York Public Library.

Gallery
Works by John Plumbe

References

Further reading

Publications by Plumbe
 Sketches of Iowa and Wisconsin : embodying the experience of a residence of three years in those territories. St. Louis : Chambers, Harris & Knapp, 1839.
 Instructions for ... Plumbe's patent improved Daguerreotype apparatus. Boston. 1841.
 Popular Magazine. National Publishing Co., 1846-1847.
 The National Plumbeotype Gallery, c. 1846-1847.
 Plumbe's Project of a Railroad to the Pacific. The Emancipator (Boston). 09-01-1847.
 The Plumbeian. 1847.
 A faithful translation of the papers respecting the grant made by Governor Alvarado to Mr. J.A. Sutter. Sacramento, CA: 1850.
 Plumbe's Memorial Pacific Railroad. 1850.
 Memorial Against Mr. Asa Whitney's Railroad Scheme. 1851.

Works about Plumbe
 Robert Taft. John Plumbe, America's First Nationally Known Photographer. American Photography 30. January 1936.
 Alan Fern, "John Plumbe and the 'Plumbeotype,'" Philadelphia Printmaking. American Prints Before 1860, Robert F. Looney, ed. (West Chester, Penn.: Tinicum Press, 1976).
 Library Company of Philadelphia. Annual Report. 1992.

External links

 WorldCat. Plumbe, John 1809-1857
 George Eastman House. Plumbe daguerreotype camera, c. 1845.
 Flickr. Col. W.W. Seaton, Mayor of Washington : plumbeotype from life
 Flickr. Boy with Toy Horn by Plumbe
 

American portrait photographers
1809 births
1857 deaths
19th-century American photographers